Mellite, also called honeystone, is an unusual mineral being also an organic chemical. It is chemically identified as an aluminium salt of mellitic acid, and specifically as aluminium benzene hexacarboxylate hexadecahydrate, with the chemical formula Al2C6(COO)6·16H2O.

It is a translucent honey-coloured crystal which can be polished and faceted to form striking gemstones. It crystallizes in the tetragonal system and occurs both in good crystals and as formless masses. It is soft with a Mohs hardness of 2 to 2.5 and has a low specific gravity of 1.6.

It was discovered originally in 1789 at Artern in Thuringia, Germany. It has subsequently also been found in Russia, Austria, the Czech Republic, and Hungary. It was named from the Greek  meli "honey", in allusion to its color.

It is found associated with lignite and is assumed to be formed from plant material with aluminium derived from clay.

Structure
The crystal structure of mellite has been determined by neutron diffraction and consists of slightly distorted Al(H2O)63+ octahedra linked by hydrogen bonds to [C6(COO)6]6− mellitate anions and water of crystallization.

See also  
 Mellitic anhydride

References

Aluminium minerals
Organic minerals
Tetragonal minerals
Minerals in space group 142
Luminescent minerals